Kors is a surname. Notable people with the surname include:

 Alan Charles Kors (born 1943), American intellectual historian
 Michael Kors (born 1959), American fashion designer

See also
 Kors Church
 KORS (disambiguation)